The Religious Kibbutz Movement (HaKibbutz HaDati) is an organizational framework for Orthodox kibbutzim in Israel.  Its membership includes 22 communities, 16 of them traditional kibbutzim, and 6 others in the category of Moshav shitufi, meaning that they have no communal dining hall or children's house but maintain a shared economy. The Religious Kibbutz Movement has about 15,000 members. It is not part of the secular Kibbutz Movement with its c. 230 kibbutzim, and it does not include the two Poalei Agudat Yisrael-affiliated religious kibbutzim.

History
The Religious Kibbutz Movement was founded in 1935 by groups of Jewish pioneers who immigrated to Palestine from Europe. It was the fourth kibbutz movement established in Palestine, after Hever Hakvutzot, HaKibbutz HaMeuhad and Hashomer Hatzair. From the outset, the policy of this movement was settlement in clusters, due to the need for religious schooling. Another consideration was the desire to counteract the influences of a secular environment: A single religious kibbutz in a non-religious environment would find it difficult to defend its religious and social principles. Bloc settlement also created the possibility for mutual assistance, with veteran settlements sharing their experience with those that came later.

Settlement blocs
In 1937-1948, the Religious Kibbutz Movement established three settlement blocs of three kibbutzim each. The first was in the Beit Shean Valley, the second was in the Hebron mountains south of Bethlehem (known as Gush Etzion), and the third was in the western Negev. Another kibbutz, Yavne, was founded in the center of the country as the core of a fourth bloc which only came into being after the establishment of the state.

Current trends
Many kibbutzim of the Religious Kibbutz Movement are in the midst of privatization, similar to the trend in non-religious kibbutzim. The movement operates a number of educational institutions, including Yeshivat Ein Tzurim, Yeshivat Ma'ale Gilboa, Ein HaNatziv Women's Seminary, the Yaacov Herzog Institute for Jewish Studies, a school for post-military Jewish studies for women on Massuot Yitzhak, and a Field School at Kfar Etzion. Three kibbutzim, Beerot Yitzhak, Sde Eliyahu and Yavneh, also offer 5-month ulpan (Hebrew language study) programs for participants from abroad.

List of member kibbutzim

Lower Galilee

Beit Rimon
Lavi
Nir Etzion (Moshav Shitufi)

Mount Gilboa

Ma'ale Gilboa
Meirav

Beit She'an Valley

Ein HaNatziv
Sde Eliyahu
Shluhot
Tirat Zvi
Shadmot Mehola (moshav shitufi)

Center

Be'erot Yitzhak
Kvutzat Yavne

Gush Etzion

Kfar Etzion
Migdal Oz
Rosh Tzurim

Shafir Region

Ein Tzurim
Massuot Yitzhak (moshav shitufi)

Western Negev

Alumim
Sa'ad

Har Hevron Region

Beit Yatir (moshav shitufi)
Ma'on (moshav shitufi)
Carmel (moshav shitufi)

See also
Settlement movement (Israel), the wider communal settlement movement within the pre-1967 borders
Midreshet Ein HaNetziv

References

External links

The Religious Kibbutz Movement 

 
Religious Zionist organizations
 
1935 establishments in Mandatory Palestine